Wetaskiwin Regional Division No. 11 or Wetaskiwin Regional Public Schools (WRPS) is the school board serving the County of Wetaskiwin No. 10. WRPS is a public school board system obliged to accept anyone who meets age and location requirements.

Size 
WRPS operates 20 public schools in Wetaskiwin, Millet, Gwynne, Pigeon Lake Buck Lake, Alder Flats and Winfield.  Also included in the school division is the Wetaskiwin Home Education system and two Colony Schools Pine Haven Colony School and Silver Creek Colony School.

Governance 
WRPS is operated by a group of seven elected trustees and one appointed trustee they then elect a chairman, and a vice-chairman. Each of the trustees overlooks a different electoral district, whether it be the city of Wetaskiwin, Millet, or other rural attendance areas.

Schools 
 Alder Flats Elementary School (Alder Flats)
 Buck Mountain Central School (Buck Lake)
 C. B. McMurdo Center (Wetaskiwin)
 Centennial Elementary School (Wetaskiwin)
 Clear Vista School (Wetaskiwin)
 Parkdale School (Wetaskiwin)
 École Queen Elizabeth School (Wetaskiwin)
 Falun Elementary School (Falun)
 Griffiths-Scott School (Millet)
 Gwynne School (Gwynne)
 Lakedell Elementary School (Westerose)
 Norwood School (Wetaskiwin)
 Pigeon Lake Regional School (Falun)
 Pine Haven Colony School (Wetaskiwin)
 Pipestone School (Millet)
 Silver Creek Colony School (Ferintosh)
 The Early Education and Family Wellness Centre (Wetaskiwin)
 Wetaskiwin Composite High School Wetaskiwin Composite High School
 Winfield School (Winfield)

See also
List of Alberta school boards

References

External links
Wetaskiwin Regional Division No. 11

School districts in Alberta